The Virtuous Sin is a 1930 American pre-Code comedy-drama film directed by George Cukor and Louis J. Gasnier and starring Walter Huston, Kay Francis, and Kenneth MacKenna. The screenplay by Martin Brown and Louise Long is based on the 1928 play The General by Lajos Zilahy. A separate 1931 German-language version The Night of Decision was shot at Paramount's Joinville Studios in Paris.

Plot
Marya is married to medical student Victor Sablin, who finds it impossible to deal with military life when he is inducted into the Russian army during World War I.  When her husband is sentenced to death by firing squad due to his insubordination, Marya offers herself to General Gregori Platoff in order to save him. When the two unexpectedly fall in love, Victor — not caring that his life has been spared — threatens to kill his rival.  His determination to eliminate the general falters when Marya confesses she is not in love with her husband — and never was.

Cast
Walter Huston as Gen. Gregori Platoff
Kay Francis as Marya Sablin
Kenneth MacKenna as Victor Sablin

Critical reception
Mordaunt Hall of the New York Times called the film "a clever comedy with a splendid performance by Walter Huston" and added, "There is a constant fund of interest in this picture's action. It is one of those rare offerings in which youth takes a back seat.

George Cukor's reflection in 1972
In the book On Cukor, director George Cukor confided to biographer Gavin Lambert: "It wasn't much good. I'd be in great shock if they [film restorationists & historians] rescued this one. I remember that I enjoyed working with Kay Francis and Walter Huston, though."

Preservation status
A complete print of this film is held by the UCLA Film and Television Archive. However, the UCLA archive's website says the print is too shrunken for projection.

See also
The Rebel (1931)

References

External links

1930 films
1930 comedy-drama films
American comedy-drama films
Films directed by George Cukor
American films based on plays
Films set in Russia
Films set in the 1910s
American black-and-white films
Paramount Pictures films
American multilingual films
1930 multilingual films
1930s English-language films
1930s American films